Lothar Kilian (12 October 1922 – 12 March 2000) was a German archaeologist and linguist, who researched Balts, Germanic peoples and the Proto-Indo-European homeland.

Biography
Lothar Kilian was born in Nida, Lithuania on 12 October 1922. He gained his Ph.D. in archaeology at the University of Königsberg in 1939. After World War II, Kilian worked at the University of Bonn and at the Rheinisches Landesmuseum Trier. Kilian authored a number of works on the origins of the Balts and Germanic peoples, and the Proto-Indo-European homeland. His studies on these subjects were important. He died on 12 March 2000.

Selected works
 Haffküstenkultur und Ursprung der Balten, 1955
 Zu Herkunft und Sprache der Prussen:, 1980
 Zum Ursprung der Indogermanen, 1983
 Zum Ursprung der Germanen, 1988

See also
 Marija Gimbutas
 J. P. Mallory

References

1922 births
2000 deaths
Balticists
German archaeologists
Germanic studies scholars
Indo-Europeanists
Linguists from Germany
University of Königsberg alumni
Academic staff of the University of Bonn
Lithuanian emigrants to Germany